Psychotria hierniana is a species of plant in the family Rubiaceae. It is endemic to São Tomé Island.

References

hierniana
Flora of São Tomé Island
Endemic flora of São Tomé and Príncipe
Vulnerable plants
Taxonomy articles created by Polbot